Bonerama is a brass funk rock band from New Orleans.

Bonerama was formed in 1998 by trombone players Mark Mullins and Craig Klein, who, from 1990 up until late 2006, were also members of Harry Connick Jr.'s big band. Shortly thereafter, they added trombone players Steve Suter, Brian O'Neill, and Rick Trolsen, sousaphone player Matt Perrine, guitarist Bert Cotton, and drummer Eric Bolivar. New Orleans drummers Russell Batiste, Stanton Moore, Doug Belote, Chad Gilmore, Terence Higgins, and Kevin O'Day have also been playing with Bonerama for periods of time. Later, Charlie Wooton and Nori Naraoka electric bass replaced Matt Perrine before his return to the band in 2013. Brian O'Neill had a heart attack and died while on a solo piano gig in New Orleans in December 2005. 

Bonerama released their debut album in 2001. On January 2, 2008, Bonerama performed the national anthem at the 2008 Sugar Bowl. On February 5, they released a joint EP with OK Go, entitled You're Not Alone, to raise money for New Orleans musicians displaced by the 2005 Hurricane Katrina. After the departure of Rick Trolsen and Steve Suter in early 2009, trombonist Greg Hicks joined the band.

Discography
 Live at the Old Point (Bonerama, 2001)
 Live from New York (Mule Train, 2004)
 Bringing It Home (MTP, 2007)
 Shake It Baby (Bonerama, 2013)
 Hot Like Fire (Basin Street, 2017)
 Bonerama Plays Zeppelin (Basin Street, 2019)

References

External links

Facebook fan page

Musical groups from New Orleans
American jazz ensembles from New Orleans
Jazz-funk trombonists